Donald Johnson and Jared Palmer were the defending champions but did not compete that year.

Wayne Black and Kevin Ullyett won in the final 6–4, 2–6, 7–6(7–4) against Wayne Arthurs and Paul Hanley.

Seeds

  Jonas Björkman /  Todd Woodbridge (quarterfinals)
  Wayne Black /  Kevin Ullyett (champions)
  Joshua Eagle /  Sandon Stolle (semifinals)
  Graydon Oliver /  Fabrice Santoro (quarterfinals)

Draw

External links
 2002 If Stockholm Open Doubles Draw

Doubles
2002 Stockholm Open